ŽŠD Celje, also known as ŽNK Celje or NK Železničar Celje, was an association football club based in the city of Celje, Slovenia. It was founded in 1951 and merged with Kladivar Celje in 1967. The new club competed under the name ŽNK Celje / Kladivar for four seasons, but then renamed simply to Kladivar.

Defunct football clubs in Slovenia
Football clubs in Yugoslavia
Association football clubs established in 1951
1951 establishments in Slovenia
Association football clubs disestablished in 1967
Sport in Celje